Istanbul Gelisim University is a private non-profit university in Istanbul, Turkey. Gelisim Education, Culture, Health, and Social Service Foundation took steps in the direction of establishing a vocational school under the name of "Istanbul Gelisim Vocational School" in 2008.

Academic units

Faculties 
 Faculty of Economics, Administrative and Social Sciences
 Faculty of Fine Arts
 Faculty of Engineering and Architecture
 Faculty of Dentistry

Institutes 
 Institute of Science and Technology
 Institute of Social Sciences
 Institute of Health Sciences

Schools 
 School of Health Sciences
 School of Applied Sciences
 School of Physical Education and Sports
 School of Foreign Languages

Vocational Schools 
 Istanbul Gelisim Vocational School
 Vocational School of Health Services

References

External links 
 Official Website (English)
 Official Website (Turkish)

Universities and colleges in Istanbul
Private universities and colleges in Turkey
Educational institutions established in 2008
2008 establishments in Turkey
Avcılar, Istanbul